The Myth of the Twentieth Century is a 1930 book by Alfred Rosenberg, a Nazi theorist and official who was convicted of crimes against humanity and other crimes at the Nuremberg trials and executed in 1946. Rosenberg was one of the principal ideologues of the Nazi Party and editor of the Nazi paper Völkischer Beobachter. In 1941, history professor Peter Viereck wrote: "In molding Germany's 'psychology of frightfulness' Rosenberg wields an influence as powerful as that of the much publicized Goebbels and the much feared Himmler and his secret police."

Thanks to Nazi support, the book sold more than one million copies by 1944. Hitler awarded a  State Prize for Art and Science to Rosenberg for the book in 1937. The document accompanying the prize "praises Rosenberg as a 'person who has, in a scientific and penetrating manner, laid the firm foundation for an understanding of the ideological bases of National Socialism'". The content of the book is a mix of racist pseudo-science and mysticism which makes the claim that the "Nordic race" originated in Atlantis and that their nobility justified the enslavement and even mass-murder of non-Aryan races.

In his  Nuremberg Trial summation, Justice Robert H. Jackson referred to the book as  a "dreary treatise[s] advocating a new and weird Nazi religion". "Mythus" is written as an imitation of a scholarly book and Veirech notes that "Rosenberg bores both the uneducated and the well educated, but is the god of the semi-educated, whom earnest dullness and obscure grandiloquence impress as scholarly and authoritative. The extermination camp commandant Rudolf Höss, said that this book was one of the sources of his own anti-semitism during the Nuremberg trials.

Some members of the Nazi leadership found some of this material embarrassing, but it was also publicly praised, often by the same Nazi leaders who disparaged the work in private.

Rosenberg's influences

Rosenberg followed a long line of European racist authors,  including Arthur de Gobineau (author of An Essay on the Inequality of the Human Races) but his most important "source" was  Houston Stewart Chamberlain. Rosenberg conceived of his book as a sequel to Chamberlain's 1899 book The Foundations of the Nineteenth Century. 

Other influences included a dubious reading of Friedrich Nietzsche, Richard Wagner's Holy Grail romanticism (Chamberlin was Wagner's son-in-law) , Haeckelian mystical vitalism, the medieval German philosopher Meister Eckhart and the heirs of his mysticism and Nordicist Aryanism in general..

Outline of contents of the book

Rosenberg's Nazi racial theories involve a mix of made up biology and invented history about the putative negative influence of the "Jewish race" in contrast to the "Aryan race". He equates the latter with the Nordic peoples of northern Europe and also includes the Berbers from North Africa ( this story apparently derives from the  Kabyle myth invented by French Colonists ) and the upper classes of Ancient Egypt (all presumably migrating from Atlantis). According to Rosenberg, modern culture has been corrupted by Semitic influences (cf. anti-Semitism), which have produced degenerate modern art, along with moral and social degeneration.  Rosenberg believed that the "higher races" should rule over the "lower" and not "interbreed with them". He  argues that the Nazis must purify the "race soul" by eliminating non-Aryan elements in much the same ruthless and uncompromising way in which a surgeon would cut a cancer from a diseased body.
These arguments were used to justify Nazi crimes,  Crimes against humanity, and the Holocaust.

In Rosenberg's mythological take on world history, migrating Aryans founded various ancient civilizations which later declined and fell due to inter-marriage with lesser races. These civilizations included the Indo-Aryan civilization, ancient Persia, Greece, and Rome. He saw the ancient Germanic invasions of the Roman empire as "saving" its civilization, which had been corrupted both by race mixing and by "Judaized-cosmopolitan" Christianity. Furthermore, he claimed that the persecutions of Protestants in France and other areas represented the wiping out of the last remnants of the Aryan element in those areas, a process completed by the French revolution. In contemporary Europe, he saw the northern areas that embraced Protestantism as closest to the Aryan racial and spiritual ideal.

Following H. S. Chamberlain and other völkisch theorists, Rosenberg claimed that Jesus was an "Aryan", and that original Christianity was an "Aryan" (Iranian) religion, but had been corrupted by the followers of Paul of Tarsus. The "Mythus" is very anti-Catholic, seeing the Church's cosmopolitanism and "Judaized" version of Christianity as one of the factors in Germany's spiritual decline. Rosenberg particularly emphasizes the supposedly  anti-Judaic teachings of the heresies Marcionism and "Aryo-Persian" Manicheanism as more representative of the true, "anti-Judaic" Jesus Christ and more suited to the Nordic world-view. Rosenberg saw Martin Luther and the Reformation as a step toward reasserting the "Aryan spirit".

When he discussed the future of religion, he suggested that a multiplicity of forms be tolerated, including "positive Christianity", neo-paganism, and a form of "purified" Aryan Hinduism.

Another myth, to which he gave credence, was the idea of Atlantis, which he claimed might preserve a memory of an ancient Aryan homeland:
And so today the long derived hypothesis becomes a probability, namely that from a northern centre of creation which, without postulating an actual submerged Atlantic continent, we may call Atlantis, swarms of warriors once fanned out in obedience to the ever renewed and incarnate Nordic longing for distance to conquer and space to shape.

Influence of the book
Johannes Steizinger writes  "Rosenberg clearly played a major role in the establishment of Nazi ideology" and that " Ideology is regarded as a necessary, but not sufficient cause for participation in genocide"

Despite Nazi support for "The Myth of the Twentieth Century" and Rosenberg's prominent role in promoting Nazi ideology, in private, some of the Nazi leaders had reservations about its mysticism.  Adolf Hitler  declared that it was not to be considered official ideology of the Nazi Party and he privately described the book as "mysticism" and "nonsense"
Albert Speer claimed that Goebbels mocked Alfred Rosenberg. Goebbels also called the book a "philosophical belch".
Hermann Göring said: "if Rosenberg was to decide ... we would only have rite, thing, myth and such kind of swindle." Gustave Gilbert, the prison psychologist during the Nuremberg Trials, reported that none of the Nazi leaders he interviewed had read Rosenberg's writings. However Gilbert's notes from the Nuremberg trials repeatedly show Rosenberg's influence 
 At lunch von Papen commented, "Dodd asked him if he knew that Hoess, the Commandant of Auschwitz, had read his works. That was, of course, the crux of the whole thing. Rosenberg just gave an evasive answer."

Although he did take very high-level positions within the Nazi state in managing propaganda, looting artworks, and overseeing Nazi rule in the Baltics and Soviet territories, the overt anti-Christian sentiment in Rosenberg's book made it awkward to give Rosenberg positions of prominence when the Nazis ascended to power . Even in their stronghold Hamburg only 0.49% of the inhabitants identified as belonging to the anti-Christian neopagan faith movement (in 1937), whereas the German Christians and their Positive Christianity had a strong standing. Many of the attacks on the book after its 1930 publication came from its explicit anti-Christian message. Rosenberg wrote two supplements to the work, replying to Catholic and Protestant critics. In the first, On the Dark Men of Our Times: A Reply to Critics of the Myth of the Twentieth Century, he accused Catholics of attempting to destroy the national character by promoting separatism within Catholic parts of the country. His second reply, Protestant Pilgrims to Rome: The Treason Against Luther and the Myth of the Twentieth Century, argued that modern Lutheranism was becoming too close to Catholicism.

See also
Antisemitism
Aryan race
Christianity and anti-Semitism
Nazi mysticism
Nordicism
Race
Racism

Notes

References
Gilbert, GM (1961) . "Nuremberg diary". New York : New American Library, 1961, c1947 430 p.
Ball, Terence and Bellamy, Richard (2003). The Cambridge History of Twentieth-Century Political Thought. Cambridge: Cambridge University Press. 
Eatwell, Roger (1995). Fascism: A History (1995). London: Chatto & Windus. 
Lukacs, John (1998). "Introduction to Mein Kampf by Adolf Hitler". Houghton Mifflin Books. 
McIver, Tom (1992). Anti-Evolution: A Reader's Guide to Writings Before and After Darwin. Baltimore, MD: Johns Hopkins University Press. 
Snyder, Louis L. (1998). Encyclopedia of the Third Reich Crown Quarto. Wordsworth Editions. 
Viereck, Peter Robert Edwin (2003; originally published in 1941). Metapolitics: From Wagner and the German Romantics to Hitler. Transaction Publishers. 
Yahil, Leni (1991). The Holocaust: The Fate of the European Jewry, 1932-1945. New York, NY: Oxford University Press.

External links 

Yad Vashem Roots of Nazi Ideology Video
Electronic copy of Gilbert's Nuremberg diary

The Myth of the 20th Century PDF

1930 non-fiction books
Nazi books
Anti-Catholicism in Germany
Antisemitic publications
Pseudohistory